Scabricola condei is a species of sea snail, a marine gastropod mollusc in the family Mitridae, the miters or miter snails.

Description
The length of the shell attains 34.2 mm.

Distribution
This marine species occurs off the Philippines.

References

 Guillot de Suduiraut E. (2001). Description de Scabricola (Scabricola) condei n.sp. (Gastropoda : Prosobranchia : Mitridae) des Philippines Novapex 2(1): 21-23 

Mitridae
Gastropods described in 2001